The Walter F. George Lake, named for Walter F. George (1878–1957), a United States senator from Georgia, is formed on the Chattahoochee River along the state line between Alabama and Georgia. It is also widely known by the name, Lake Eufaula – particularly in Alabama, where the state legislature passed a resolution on June 25, 1963, to give the lake that name. Popular activities along the lake include camping and trophy fishing.

The lake is primarily controlled by the United States Army Corps of Engineers. The states control several other protected lands along the lake, including the Eufaula National Wildlife Refuge and Lakepoint State Park in Alabama, and Florence Marina and George T. Bagby state parks in Georgia.

The flooding of the land in the area covered numerous historic and prehistoric sites associated with Native American culture. Indigenous peoples had lived along the river for thousands of years. The unincorporated area of Oketeyeconne, Georgia, which historically had a majority of Native American residents, was evacuated in the 1950s to allow creation of the lake.

References

External links
Official website
Visitor's website

LWalter F. George
Chattahoochee River
Dams in Georgia (U.S. state)
United States Army Corps of Engineers dams
Reservoirs in Alabama
George, Walter F.
Bodies of water of Barbour County, Alabama
Bodies of water of Henry County, Alabama
Bodies of water of Russell County, Alabama
Protected areas of Quitman County, Georgia
Protected areas of Stewart County, Georgia
Protected areas of Henry County, Alabama
Protected areas of Clay County, Georgia
Bodies of water of Clay County, Georgia
Bodies of water of Stewart County, Georgia
Bodies of water of Quitman County, Georgia
Protected areas of Barbour County, Alabama